is a fictional character  and the primary antagonist of Nintendo's The Legend of Zelda video game series and franchise, as well as the final boss in many Zelda titles. A massive and malevolent creature, he first appeared in the original game, The Legend of Zelda (1986), and has since appeared in the majority of the games in the series. Ganon is the archenemy of the protagonist Link and originally the leader of the Gerudo, a race of humanoid desert nomads before becoming the ruler of his demons. In his original Gerudo form, from which he can change magically, he is known as 

His specific motives vary from game to game, but most often involve capturing Princess Zelda of Hyrule, the games' usual setting, and planning to conquer Hyrule and the world at large. To this end, he seeks the Triforce, an omnipotent artifact that grants any wish its bearer desires, and usually manipulates several other villains to realize his ambitions. In most games, he possesses the Triforce of Power, which gives him godlike strength, boundless mystical power, and invulnerability to all but the most powerful sacred weapons, such as the Master Sword.

As the main villain of the series, Ganon has also appeared in a variety of media and merchandise, including an animated television series, manga and Amiibo. He appears in various spin-off games, such as Hyrule Warriors and Age of Calamity, and also appears in the Super Smash Bros. series.

The character has been well received by critics, becoming one of the most popular and recognizable villains in gaming. He has been praised by critics for providing some of the most memorable boss battles in gaming and has been named as one of the greatest video game villains of all time.

Concept and creation

Names 
Ganon was originally known as "Hakkai" during development of the original The Legend of Zelda, in reference to a humanoid pig character known as Zhu Bajie (Cho Hakkai in Japanese) from the 16th century Chinese novel Journey to the West. The character is given the name "Ganondorf Dragmire" in the English version of the A Link to the Past instruction manual while his monster form's name was "Mandrag Ganon". The names "Dragmire" and "Mandrag Ganon" have not appeared in any of the games or other manuals, though the name "Ganondorf Dragmire" is used once on the official Zelda website.

Ganon is named inconsistently throughout the series. In the Japanese versions of the first three games, his name is anglicized as "Gannon". This spelling appears in two Western releases: the original The Legend of Zelda, and the non-canonical Zelda's Adventure.

Character design 

Ganon has two basic forms that appear throughout the series: one is a gigantic pig-like form, and the other is his humanoid Gerudo form. In the original The Legend of Zelda, A Link to the Past, Oracle of Seasons and Oracle of Ages, Four Swords Adventures, and A Link Between Worlds, he is depicted as a blue, porcine biped wielding either a large sword or a trident. Ocarina of Time marks the first appearance of his humanoid form named Ganondorf, the physically imposing and armor-clad Lord of the Gerudo people. Like all Gerudo, he possesses olive dark skin, amber eyes, and red hair.

For the development of Ocarina of Time, Ganon was conceived by character designer Satoru Takizawa. Takizawa had imagined Ganon as a "crooked and complex thief, who was basically an all-around abominable human being". However, script director Toru Osawa claimed that this image was "not the case". He began to speak of how Ganondorf was meant to have "parts where he is rather good", comparing him to the character of Raoh in Fist of the North Star. With this idea in mind, Takizawa created a tentative model of Ganondorf based on actor Christopher Lambert. The result of Ganondorf was very different from this model, with three forms of the character being created: one of Ganondorf in the beginning; one of Ganondorf seven years later, with longer hair; and one of Ganon in the end. Since Ganon appeared as a boar-like creature, Takizawa decided that Ganondorf should transform into such at the end of the game, despite the opinions of other staff members. He decided on making Ganon a beast "with the feeling of a pig" to reference A Link to the Past.

In The Wind Waker, Ganondorf appears as an older character to his first appearance in Ocarina of Time. The artists depicted him as middle-aged and created drawings of him "with an Eastern flavor". His robe was decorated with patterns that were designed to be a twist on the mark of the Gerudo seen previously. Ganondorf's reappearance in Twilight Princess returned him to a similar age to his original appearance in Ocarina of Time. His design was created to look like a warrior, dressed in armour. He also transforms into Demonic Beast Ganon and this concept art was created with the caption "Pig Ganon".

In Breath of the Wild, Ganon has three forms. For most of the game he is visible from a distance as a serpentine cloud of Malice—a signature viscous, burning energy that is used to denote his heavy influence—that circles Hyrule Castle. His physical form Calamity Ganon is a grotesque incomplete monster that resembles a spider equipped with various weapons. In the game's final battle he transforms into Dark Beast Ganon, a giant boar-like monster made of Malice. Artist Yuki Hamada commented: "Dark Beast Ganon takes the shape of a boar like the Ganons of prior games but ended up being very large compared to Link since we wanted the game to end in the vast open plain of Hyrule Field. This might be the biggest Ganon in the history of the series". The Phantom Ganons that Link encounters in the Divine Beasts were designed with similar attributes as the manifestations of Ganon, including his red hair, as the artist Takafumi Kiuchi wanted players to feel Ganon's presence at all times.

Portrayal 
Ganon has been voiced by several voice actors. In the 1989 The Legend of Zelda animated television series and Captain N: The Game Master, he was voiced by Len Carlson. In Link: The Faces of Evil and Zelda: The Wand of Gamelon, he was voiced by Mark Berry. For BS Zelda no Densetsu he was voiced by Seizō Katō. In the Zelda series and other spin-off games, the character has been voiced by several Japanese voice actors, including Takashi Nagasako in Ocarina of Time, The Wind Waker, Super Smash Bros. Melee and Super Smash Bros. Ultimate; Hironori Miyata in Twilight Princess, Super Smash Bros. Brawl and Super Smash Bros. for Nintendo 3DS and Wii U; and Taiten Kusunoki in Hyrule Warriors.

Characteristics 
Ganon is the main antagonist in The Legend of Zelda series and is presented as the embodiment of evil. He usually appears as the final boss at the end of each game. A recurring storyline in the series centres around the protagonist Link fighting to save Princess Zelda after she is captured by Ganon. Over the course of the series, Ganon has been depicted in various physical forms. His original human form known as Ganondorf is the king and the only male member of the Gerudo in Ocarina of Time and Four Swords Adventures. He bears the physical traits of the Gerudo race, having red hair, dark skin and pointy ears. He also often transforms into a monstrous beast resembling a giant boar with glowing eyes. Ganon has been given various titles over the series, including "King of Evil", "King of Thieves", "the Dark Lord", "King of Darkness" and "Prince of Darkness".

As the embodiment of evil, the character's presence spreads darkness and wards off good magic, a characteristic which is affirmed by the fairy Navi in Ocarina of Time. Ganon is consumed and powered by his malice and hatred. In Skyward Sword, he is revealed as the manifestation of the antagonist Demon King Demise's hatred following the character's defeat. The game was presented as the start of the fictional Zelda timeline in which Ganon is destined to forever return in an endless battle with Link and Zelda. In Twilight Princess, he is shown to absorb the resentment and anger of other characters and uses it to become more powerful. In the final boss battle in Breath of the Wild, he transforms into Dark Beast Ganon and is described as "Hatred and Malice Incarnate".

The character's motivations typically centre around destroying Hyrule or placing himself in a position of power as ruler. His destructive influence is particularly illustrated in Ocarina of Time, when Link awakens from a seven-year sleep to discover Hyrule transformed following Ganondorf's rise to power. In place of the former peaceful kingdom, Hyrule becomes a place of fear shrouded in darkness and populated by monsters and ReDead zombies.

In the lore of the series, Ganon is the bearer of the Triforce of Power, a divine symbol and one of three components that form the Triforce. It bestows "true power" onto its wielder, making him physically strong and powerful in the use of magic. The position of the Triforce of Power at the top of the Triforce places him in direct opposition to Link and Zelda as bearers of the Triforce of Courage and Wisdom respectively. A recurring plot element in the series is Ganon's desire to obtain the completed Triforce, which offers limitless power to its bearer. This struggle for control of the Triforce has been a central aspect of several games, such as Ocarina of Time, and binds the three main characters in an eternal battle across the fictional Zelda timeline.

Powers and abilities 
As the final boss in the games, Ganon/Ganondorf is presented as a dangerous foe who is difficult to defeat. He is a formidable warrior and sorcerer, and he is skilled enough a swordsman to combat Link. He is capable of dual-wielding large blades, such as great swords. He also possesses great physical strength, which can be seen in Ocarina of Time, where he destroys Hyrule Castle with one punch. In Twilight Princess, the character displays invincibility when he is sentenced to execution for attempting to conquer Hyrule but the Sages are unable to take his life. He is typically only defeated by Link with the use of a legendary weapon like the Master Sword or Light Arrows. Due to his near-immortality and indestructible power, he often needs to be sealed away in another realm by magic to prevent him from causing more destruction. However, the character is always reincarnated in a subsequent game, which emphasises his immortality.

Over the course of the Zelda series, Ganon/Ganondorf has demonstrated various magical powers and abilities. These powers originate in his use of dark magic and have varied across the game series. He can use various defensive measures in combat, such as using dark magic to create magical barriers. In the original The Legend of Zelda game he is able to turn himself invisible and uses his magic to propel fireballs at Link. In several games, such as Ocarina of Time, he is able to create shadow clones of himself that possess his skills and abilities but are immune to damage. Ganondorf also has the ability of teleportation, giving him the advantage of sneaking behind his opponent in combat in Twilight Princess. In Ocarina of Time he has the ability to levitate. He has also demonstrated that he can pass between dimensions, such as the Dark World and the Twilight Realm.

Ganon has the power to possess and control other characters. This is particularly evident in Twilight Princess, where he possesses Princess Zelda and uses her body like a puppet to fight against Link. He can also manipulate other characters for his own benefit, including Zant in Twilight Princess. In Breath of the Wild, Calamity Ganon is able to corrupt creatures with the spread of a substance called Malice. This gives him the ability to take control of monsters and the ancient technology that was originally under the control of Hyrule, such as the Guardians.

Appearances

The Legend of Zelda series 

Ganon made his first appearance in the original 1986 NES video game The Legend of Zelda, in the form of a blue monstrous pig named "Gannon". The first game in the series established the character's desire for power, which was reiterated in subsequent games. The storyline involves the character invading Hyrule with his army and stealing the Triforce of Power. To prevent him from obtaining the Triforce of Wisdom, Princess Zelda scatters the eight pieces across the kingdom. Link is then sent on a quest to retrieve the eight fragments and finally defeats Gannon using a silver arrow.

In 1987, the second entry in the Zelda series was released, titled Zelda II: The Adventure of Link, but the game did not feature the physical presence of Ganon. However, his image appears in the final game over screen, signifying the return of Ganon.

The character's next appearance was in the 1991 Super Nintendo Entertainment System game A Link to the Past. The game expands on Ganon's backstory by revealing that he used to be a man named Ganondorf, the leader of a group of thieves who manage to enter the Sacred Realm and steal the Triforce, which plunges the Sacred Realm into darkness. Ganon is already sealed in this Dark World when Link and Zelda are sent there by the wizard Agahnim. In truth, Agahnim is an avatar used to contain Ganon's spirit outside the Sacred Realm. After Link defeats Agahnim in the Dark World, Ganon rises from his body and turns into a bat. At the Pyramid of Power, Link finally defeats Ganon in his beast form in order to restore Hyrule and the Sacred Realm.

In the 1993 game Link's Awakening, the fourth Shadow Nightmare that Link must face in the final boss battle is based on Ganon from A Link to the Past. During the battle, the Shadow of Ganon shoots bats made from fire and throws a spinning trident at Link.

The 1998 game Ocarina of Time, which was released for the Nintendo 64, introduced the character in his humanoid form as Ganondorf, the king of the Gerudo thieves. In the chronology of the series, it is his earliest appearance, expanding upon the backstory first introduced in A Link to the Past. In the story, Ganondorf schemes to take the Triforce in order to conquer Hyrule. After pulling the Master Sword from its pedestal and being put into a seven-year sleep, Link wakes as an adult to discover that Ganondorf is now ruling over Hyrule. Ganondorf successfully stole the Triforce from the Sacred Realm but his evil heart broke it into three pieces, with Ganondorf keeping the Triforce of Power. In the final boss fight, Link and Ganondorf battle at Ganon's Castle, but after Ganondorf's defeat, he transforms into his beast form Ganon. He is finally defeated by Link before being sealed away in the Dark Realm by the Sages.

In 2001, Oracle of Seasons and Oracle of Ages were released for the Game Boy Color handheld console. The two games feature their own antagonists, but upon completing either game, the player receives a password that provides access to a linked game in the opposite title. The linked game reveals Ganon as the secret final boss, who was resurrected by two witches named Twinrova.

Ganon appears in the 2002 GameCube game The Wind Waker, resuming his plans to obtain the complete Triforce and conquer Hyrule. In the backstory of the game, the goddesses flood Hyrule to prevent Ganon from gaining power. Although he does not at first appear as the main villain, he is revealed to be the master of the Helmaroc King. He kidnaps Zelda, in her guise of Tetra, to complete the Triforce and gain ultimate power over Hyrule. His plans ultimately fail and in the final boss battle, Link defeats Ganondorf by thrusting the Master Sword into his forehead, turning him to stone.

In the 2004 GameCube game Four Sword's Adventures, the antagonists are initially shown to be Shadow Link and Vaati. However, Ganon is revealed to be the true villain who stole a powerful magical trident and Dark Mirror to create the evil version of Link. Ganon uses Shadow Link to kidnap the shrine maidens of Hyrule and murders the Knights of Hyrule, trapping them in the World of Darkness. Link with his clones frees the shrine maidens and seals Ganon inside the Four Sword to return peace to Hyrule.

In Twilight Princess, which was released in 2006 for the Wii and GameCube, Ganondorf is the catalyst to the game's events, allying himself with Zant to take over Hyrule. In the game's backstory, the Sages banish Ganon with the Mirror of Twilight after he tried to steal the Triforce. After Link and his companion Midna defeat Zant, they face Ganondorf for the final battle at Hyrule Castle. Ganondorf battles Link by possessing Zelda and using her like a puppet and afterwards transforms into his beast form. After Link slays Ganon, Midna safely transports Link and Zelda to Hyrule field, but Link is forced to again face Ganondorf in his human form. Ganondorf is defeated by Link with the help of Zelda's Light Arrows when Link finally plunges the Master Sword into Ganondorf's chest.

In the 2007 Nintendo DS game Phantom Hourglass, which is a direct sequel to The Wind Waker, Ganondorf only appears in a cameo in the opening sequence that summarizes the plot of the latter game.

Ganon does not appear in the 2011 Wii game Skyward Sword as he was replaced by a new antagonist named Lord Ghirahim. Talking to Nintendo Power, Eiji Aonuma explained that he wanted a different kind of antagonist and that Ghirahim was created to contrast with Ganon's "very masculine, powerful, evil" image. Despite his absence, the game suggests that Ganon is the manifestation of the game's demonic god named Demise when Link's companion Fi says that Demise is "the source of all monsters". Demise's final curse also establishes that Ganon, Link and Zelda are placed in an eternal cycle of conflict.

In the 2013 Nintendo 3DS game A Link Between Worlds, Ganon, in his original form, makes a minor appearance, though his past actions and influence greatly affect the course of events throughout the story and serves as the inspiration for Yuga. Yuga summons him back from his seal with the power of the seven sages, previously trapped within paintings by Yuga, and fuses with Ganon to become Yuga Ganon, but is defeated by Link.

The character appears in Breath of the Wild, released in 2017 for Nintendo Switch and Wii U. Having grown tired of reincarnation, Ganon gives into malice and hatred in exchange for power to end the cycle and becomes the malevolent force called Calamity Ganon. In the backstory, he returns from an earlier defeat to take control of an army of Guardian robots, which he uses against the Hyruleans with the aim of destroying Hyrule. Using his Blight Ganon doppelgängers he murders the four Champions to take control of the powerful ancient technology that they piloted known as the four Divine Beasts. Hyrule is consequently reduced to a wasteland inhabited by roaming monsters. Link is severely injured during a subsequent battle with the Guardian robots in an effort to protect Princess Zelda and is placed into a hundred-year-long slumber to heal, before Zelda awakens him to destroy Ganon.

Other video games 
Ganon makes an appearance in the 1992 Zelda no Densetsu: Kamigami no Triforce (Barcode Battler II). The game was released by Epoch Co. and involves scanning barcodes to battle enemies on cards with a story based on A Link to the Past.

Ganon appears in his "demon boar" form in two of the three CD-i Zelda titles: Zelda: The Wand of Gamelon and Link: The Faces of Evil. The games centre on Ganon attacking Gamelon and the island of Koridai. In Zelda's Adventure, Ganon takes over the kingdom of Tolemac and captures Link.

Ganondorf made his first appearance in the Super Smash Bros. series in his Ocarina of Time design as an unlockable character in Super Smash Bros. Melee. He reappears in all subsequent installments, including Super Smash Bros. Brawl, Super Smash Bros. for Nintendo 3DS and Wii U and Super Smash Bros. Ultimate. In Super Smash Bros. Melee, Ganondorf's moveset was a slower, stronger version of Captain Falcon's and his Warlock Punch was based on the Falcon Punch. For Super Smash Bros. Brawl, Eiji Aonuma said that his design team submitted designs to the developers for Ganondorf based on Twilight Princess. Ganondorf appears in the single-player The Subspace Emissary mode, allied with Bowser and Wario. His final smash is his "Dark Beast Ganon" form from Twilight Princess, in which he transforms, charges across the screen and then warps himself back onto the stage. Ganondorf was also included as an unlockable character in Super Smash Bros. for Nintendo 3DS and Wii U, which features a similar moveset but introduces the use of a sword in place of his Warlock Punch as a custom move. In Super Smash Bros. Ultimate, Ganondorf's design matches his Ocarina of Time appearance again and he uses his sword for Smash Attacks. He has several special moves, including transforming into Demon King Ganon for his final smash.

Ganondorf appears as a playable character in the Zelda spin-off title Hyrule Warriors. He features alongside various other characters from the Zelda series, including villains Ghirahim from Skyward Sword and Zant from Twilight Princess. He can also be customised with several outfits, including his Demon King costume set.

Ganon can be summoned into a player's village in Animal Crossing: New Leaf by scanning a compatible amiibo that was released for the 30th anniversary of The Legend of Zelda series. Ganondorf is available as an unlockable "Mystery Mushroom" costume in Super Mario Maker. He is also playable in the Nintendo Switch version of Diablo III: Eternal Collection, with the Switch version of the game exclusively offering amiibo support and additional content based on The Legend of Zelda series. Ganon also makes a cameo appearance alongside Link in Scribblenauts Unlimited.

Ganon is the final boss in the 2019 Nintendo Switch rhythm game Cadence of Hyrule. The storyline involves Link, Zelda and Cadence searching for four magic instruments to defeat Ganon.

Calamity Ganon appears in the 2020 hack and slash video game Hyrule Warriors: Age of Calamity. In addition to being the main antagonist of the game, he can also be unlocked as a playable character at the end of the game after the player completes all of the challenges.

In 2021, Nintendo released Game & Watch: The Legend of Zelda, a handheld unit that incorporates three games, The Legend of Zelda, The Adventure of Link and Link's Awakening. The unit celebrates 35 years of The Legend of Zelda series and revisits Link's first battle with Ganon in the original game.

Television series 
Ganon appears as the main villain of the 1989 The Legend of Zelda cartoon, which was shown as part of The Super Mario Bros. Super Show! in syndication that year. In the cartoon, Ganon is a brown-skinned anthropomorphic boar and wizard with a squeally voice. He is in possession of the Triforce of Power and spends each episode plotting to steal the Triforce of Wisdom and take over Hyrule. However, his plan is usually thwarted by Link and Zelda by the end of the episode. With powerful magical abilities and a quick temper, Ganon is depicted as a menacing character who will do whatever is necessary, including sacrificing his minions, in order to win his victory. He was voiced by Len Carlson.

In addition to the Zelda cartoon, Ganon (along with Link and Zelda) also appeared in Captain N: The Game Master, as a secondary villain in the episode "Quest for the Potion of Power". During the episode, Ganon is revived, double-crosses Mother Brain, and is killed by the reflected magic on Link's shield.

In the South Park episode "Imaginationland Episode III", Ganondorf makes an appearance in his Ocarina of Time incarnation as one of many evil characters battling the good characters.

Comics and manga 
The Legend of Zelda comic series published in the 1990s by Valiant Comics was based on The Legend of Zelda games and featured Ganon as an antagonist in the stories and bonus stories.

Ganon has appeared in The Legend of Zelda manga. In The Legend of Zelda: Ocarina of Time manga, which was originally published in two volumes and written by Akira Himekawa, the storyline provides additional details to the game's plot in which Link defeats Ganondorf and restores peace to Hyrule.

Reception 

Critics have responded positively to the character. In 2008, GameDaily ranked him the second on their lists of "Top Ten Nintendo Characters That Deserve Their Own Games" list and in 2009 as the "Most Persistent Video Game Villains of All Time". GamesRadar listed him second on their 2009 list of "The Top Video Game Villains who will Never Stay Dead". IGN listed Ganon as one of the "Top 10 Characters In Need of a Spin-Off" and ranked him third on its "Top 100 Videogames Villains" list. GameSpot also included him in its "Top Ten Video Game Villains". Jeff Mills for The Escapist included Ganon on a 2017 list of "8 of the Strongest Video Game Villains of All Time": "The possessor of the Triforce of Power, he has astonishing magical and physical powers, including what seems to be near-immortality. Ganon tends to be portrayed as the personification of evil, as opposed to Link, who personifies benevolence". In 2021, Melody Macready of Screen Rant opined that Dark Lord Ganondorf in Twilight Princess is the best incarnation of the character and commented that "he was darker, more menacing than ever, had no problem slaughtering innocents, and Nintendo didn't shy away from his brutality". Matt Kamen for Wired responded positively to the presence of Calamity Ganon in Breath of the Wild: "Ganon is the de facto supervillain of the Zelda series, but he's never been so threatening as he is here. He's seen in the distance from almost any high point, a towering dragon of roiling dark energy, coiled ominously around Hyrule Castle".

The boss fights between Link and Ganon have been the subject of critical commentary. In 2004, GameSpot counted his appearance in Ocarina of Time among the "Top Ten Boss Fights": "Ganon is one of the most classic and memorable bosses ever to rule a video game, and the Ocarina of Time fight with him is his most amazing appearance yet". In 2012, Mark Langshaw of Digital Spy also considered the final battle against Ganon/Ganondorf in Ocarina of Time to be one of the most memorable boss battles, commenting that "the dual contest against Ganondorf and his monstrous alter ego was a fitting end to an epic adventure". Chris Freiburg for Den of Geek also chose Ganon in Ocarina of Time as the best boss fight, describing him as "a towering pig beast wielding two massive swords in an arena surrounded by a ring of fire" and opined, "it's hard not to consider it the best boss fight in franchise history". In 2017, Brian Shea writing for Game Informer ranked all the appearances of Ganon and chose his battle with Link in The Wind Waker as the greatest moment, commenting that the final blow in the scene "is in stark contrast to the cute cel-shaded visual style in the best way possible" and "delivers players one of the most memorable final sequences in gaming". In 2021, Marco Vito Oddo writing for Collider ranked every appearance of Ganon and considered the final boss battle in The Wind Waker as the best Ganondorf duel in The Legend of Zelda franchise. By contrast, he considered the final boss battle in Breath of the Wild to be "utterly disappointing", describing Calamity Ganon as "another giant blob of dark energy that fights just like every other Ganon Blight the player already fought and defeated" and "an unsatisfactory ending to a fantastic game". Gaming Bolt named Dark Beast Ganon as one of "13 Badass Looking Bosses That Were Ultimately Pushovers": "The fight against Calamity Ganon is disappointingly easy as it is, but then you take on his second form, Dark Beast Ganon, which turns out to be even more of a cakewalk. Given how menacing the devilish creature looks, you wouldn't expect him to go down this easily".

Critics have also commented on Ganon's appearance in the Super Smash Bros. series. Jeremy Parish of Polygon ranked 73 fighters from Super Smash Bros. Ultimate "from garbage to glorious", placing Ganon at 33rd, and stated that "Ganon looked cool and scary in Ocarina of Time, but he's more or less become a swarthier version of Mega Man's Dr. Wily: A villain so overplayed he's become practically comical". Gavin Jasper of Den of Geek ranked Ganon as 54th on his list of Super Smash Bros. Ultimate characters, stating that "Ganondorf is a great villain and all, but his Gerudo form mainly exists for the build-up until it's time for him to hit his Ganon form so that the true battle can begin. He remains his lesser form, only becoming Ganon for his Final Smash or for a specific boss fight".

Legacy 
Ganon is one of the most recognizable and popular villains in gaming and has been met with positive reception over the years. As the main villain of the series, his image has been recreated in various forms of fan art. He is also a popular character with fans for cosplay. The character has also appeared in various Zelda merchandise, including collectible figurines and Amiibo.

In 2010, Nintendo Power named him the best villain in Nintendo history. In 2013, Ganon was chosen as the fourth greatest videogame villain of all time in a poll for Guinness World Records 2013 Gamer’s Edition. GamesRadar ranked him in 2013 as the best villain in the history of video games. In 2018, GamesRadar staff described Ganon as the fourth best villain in video games: "Ganon isn't meant to be a single, defined character. Ganon is evil. Like evil in our own world, Ganon can never be completely contained or eliminated. He'll always appear again in a new form suited to subverting the peaceful ways that arise in his temporary absence".

See also 
 Characters of The Legend of Zelda

Notes

References

External links
Ganon at Zelda.com

Deity characters in video games
Demon characters in video games
Emperor and empress characters in video games
Fictional criminals in video games
Fictional dictators
Fictional gods
Fictional humanoids
Fictional kidnappers
Fictional kings
Fictional mass murderers
Fictional monsters
Fictional pigs
Fictional professional thieves
Fictional swordfighters in video games
Fictional warlords in video games
King characters in video games
Male video game villains
Nintendo antagonists
Prince characters in video games
Shapeshifter characters in video games
Super Smash Bros. fighters
The Legend of Zelda characters
Video game bosses
Video game characters introduced in 1986
Video game characters who use magic
Fictional polearm and spearfighters